Primary nursing is a system of nursing care delivery that emphasizes continuity of care and responsibility acceptance by having one registered nurse (RN), often teamed with a licensed practical nurse (LPN) and/or nursing assistant (NA), who together provide complete care for a group of patients throughout their stay in a hospital unit or department. While the patient is on the nurses' unit, the primary nurse accepts responsibility for administering some and coordinating all aspects of the patient's nursing care, with the support of other members of the nursing staff. This results in the nurse having greater insight into the patient's condition, both medical and emotional.

This is distinguished from the practice of team nursing, functional nursing, or total patient care, in that primary nursing focuses on the therapeutic relationship between a patient and a named nurse who assumes responsibility for a patient's plan of care for their length of stay in a particular area. The patient is aware of who their nurse is in primary nursing, and can communicate to the entire hospital staff through that nurse.  The nurse accepts responsibility for the patient's care.

It originated in 1969 by staff nurses at the University of Minnesota.

Primary nursing description

A delivery system is a set of organizing principles that is used to deliver a product or service and generally consist of four elements: decision-making, work allocation, communication, and management. Primary nursing moves decision-making to the primary nurse, giving the primary nurse responsibility for the care of the patient. Results include shorter hospital stays, increased patient satisfaction, fewer medical complications, and less staff absenteeism. Work is allocated by the primary nurse to other staff in their absence, accountability remains with the primary nurse. Communication between the patient, the physician and the nurse is improved because the primary nurse is the central hub, and responsible for all communications. "All a good phsysician wants is quality care for his patient, and if primary nursing is the way to get it they are all for it", says Lawrence J. Donnelly, RN, Director of Nursing at Glendale Memorial Hospital.

Effect on Nursing Retention
Shortages of qualified nurses and nursing retention issues are long-standing challenges for hospitals. Reasons for nursing turnover including dissatisfaction with the way they are required to practice nursing, in team nursing environments. Primary nursing grew out of a group of nurses and nurse supervisors working together to address that dissatisfaction.  Charlotte Dison of Baptist Hospital of Miami stated that primary nursing increased nursing retention because "the nurse is more satisfied with her environment. Absenteeism tends to be less, and there is a greater commitment to the patient." Dick Otswald, Vice President Nursing at Wausau Hospitals, believed that returning nurses to direct patient care versus administrative duties would increase retention because the reason people go in to nursing is to give patient care.

Patient experience
In team nursing, "the tasks got done, but patients often went home poorly taught (to take care of themselves) and the caring aspect of nursing wasn't carried out" said Karen Ciske, a former staff nurse and nursing instructor and a member of the University of Minnesota Hospitals' primary-nursing project. Ciske said that the one-to-one communication between nurse and patient is .. "where you form a relationship and patients open up to you. Not back with the charts and the pills."
Patients reported satisfaction with the system because care is personalized to them.  The trust relationship between the nurse and the patient is critical. "Gaining a patient's trust means they will tell me about any discomfort to changes going on in their body that the monitors might not pick up."

That patient-nurse relationship carries over to the family, and helps the nurse with discharge planning, as they're able to assess the patient's support system outside of the hospital. The patient-focused continuity of care of primary nursing also affects the patient's family. Penni Weston, primary nursing project coordinator at St. Alexius explained, "The family knows which nurse to talk to" when they have questions or anxiety about the patient's recovery. In a University of Michigan study, two groups of kidney-transplant patients were compared, one under primary nursing, the other under team nursing. The patients under team nursing experienced an average of four complications after the operation. The patients under primary nursing experienced an average of one complication after the operation, and so were able to be discharged from the hospital sooner.

Comparison between nursing care delivery systems

The following table illustrates the similarities and differences between the four most common nursing care delivery systems:

The team nursing model is where the RN gives the patient a pill, the practical nurse changes the patient's bed linens, and the nurses' aide brings the bed pan - the RN only saw the patient that one time, when they gave the patient the pill. In primary nursing, the primary nurse gives the pill, teaches the patient about what the effects of the medication are, and monitors the patient's reaction to the medication. On discharge, the primary nurse can recommend the best time of day for the patient to take the pill, based on what they've seen during the patient's hospital stay. The primary nurse is also more alert to medication errors, because of their greater awareness of patient medication outcomes.

In the total patient care system (or modified primary nursing), the responsibility aspect of primary nursing is not implemented. However RN's do still provide more patient care than under team nursing, and have less supervisory duties over other caregivers.

Myths and facts about primary nursing
The following table explores contrasting perspectives on primary nursing

History
Primary nursing is a return to the relationship between the nurse and patient being primary, with the nurse bringing all of her professional knowledge and expertise to her care of the patient.

In the 1920s and earlier, nearly all nursing was home care nursing, in which the nurse alone managed the patient's care. Hospitals trained nurses, and those student nurses provided the care in hospitals. Once the student nurse graduated and became a professional nurse, they would be on their own professionally, managing themselves as a business with clients who required care at home. In World War II, registered nurses (RN's) were drawn into care of the wounded. The staffing available to hospitals was limited to Licensed Practical Nurses (LPN's) and Nurses Aides, so the functional model of nursing was implemented. In functional nursing, each person is assigned tasks limited by their qualifications. After the war, hospitals were built all over the US to continue to provide care to the wounded, and expand the health of the population. Functional nursing remained in place as demand for nurses constantly was greater than the supply of nurses, so the work was assigned out to various roles: orderlies, technicians, nursing assistants, practical nurses, and aides - and the Registered Nurse had oversight over all of them, rarely seeing a patient themselves. Nursing dissatisfaction and turnover was a continual problem throughout the 1950s and 1960s.  The return of primary nursing started in 1969 on Unit 32 at the University of Minnesota Hospital.

The first seminar presenting primary nursing to the nursing community took place in 1970, and the first article was published that same year in Nursing Forum.  A second article, "A Dialogue on Primary Nursing", was published in the journal Nursing Forum in October 1970.  Throughout the 1970s, hospitals started to see the benefits of a primary nursing care delivery system to patients and nurses. In the Twin Cities, hospitals that implemented primary nursing in the 1970s included Hennepin County Medical Center, United Hospital, Bethesda Lutheran Medical Center, the Veterans Administration hospital and the University Hospital.  St. Alexius implemented primary nursing in the early 1980s, crediting it with improved outcomes. The nursing staffs at Boston Beth Israel led by Joyce Clifford and Evanston Hospital led by June Werner were early adopters of primary nursing and were recognized for their outstanding work in fully implementing this professional nursing model.

Hospitals' attempts to implement primary nursing were hindered by the initially-higher costs of a more professional staff. Some hospitals initially implemented a modified version in which responsibilities are moved toward a patient focus.

Implementation
As implementation of primary nursing continued, patients reported satisfaction with the system because care is personalized to them. Hospital-level resistance to primary nursing comes from the difficulty of integrating the primary nursing process within usual hospital processes. Changes required may include the nurse-doctor relationship, staffing patterns and nursing supervision practices. Changes are also required to the technical support systems underlying nursing practice. Marie Manthey asserts that a nursing system can support either professional (nursing) values or bureaucratic (hospital) values as it either focuses on caring for people or tending to the needs of an organization. “Primary nursing is a delivery system for nursing at the station level that facilitates professional nursing practice despite the bureaucratic nature of hospitals. The practice of any profession is based on an independent assessment of a client’s needs which determines the kind and amount of service to be rendered: services in bureaucracies are usually delivered according to routine pre-established procedures without sensitivity to variations in needs.” Manthey also stated that primary nursing is sometimes rejected because the nursing leader is afraid of losing authority.

The implementation of primary nursing outside of the U.S. started in England, where the term 'named nurse' was used in the National Health Service. John Major announced the Patient's Charter in 1991, one component of which was that "a named qualified nurse, midwife, or health visitor .. will be responsible for your nursing or midwifery care." In making this policy change, he stressed that Nursing was being recognized as a key component of medicine, that well-trained nurses' greater responsibilities were a benefit for the health system and for patients. While the Royal College of Nursing supported this greater role for nursing, cost challenges were also acknowledged. Stephen Wright at Tameside promoted primary nursing's benefits, while also acknowledging the challenges. The benefits Wright identified of primary nursing include reduced patient complaints, fewer medical complications, and less staff absenteeism. The discomfort of doctors working with different primary nurses, rather than one specific head nurse/ward sister is a challenge. Also, for the primary nurse, taking responsibility for the patient's care from admission to discharge requires an adequate support system. Wright said, "It can be pretty scary if you are totally responsible for a patient's care. The bus stops with you." Wright also stressed the need for adequate funding of the new system. Imperfect conditions meant that at times the ward sister (similar to Head Nurse in the U.S.) was treated as a primary nurse in some cases, meaning that Patient was given her name as their nurse. The Royal College of Nursing stated that since the named nurse concept meant "qualified staff having responsibility for designated patients", the ward sister assignment as named nurse was not realistic. Possible cost savings to support the hiring of additional qualified nurses were identified to include reducing shift change from two hours down to one, reducing supervision costs, and moving clerical and housekeeping tasks from nursing to other hospital staff members.

In the 1990s, industry consultants led a movement of hospitals into restructuring and re-engineering in the name of cost-cutting, that had the effect of reducing professional nursing autonomy and judgment by use of multi-skilled team members. The term primary nursing fell out of use, and the concepts were modified. Other changes included de-emphasis of the nurse-patient relationship. This had a negative effect on nursing satisfaction with the care they were able to provide to patients.

In the UK, hospital restructuring had the effect of spreading skilled work among a wider variety of staff. This 'changing skill mix' had the effect of increasing the managerial, medical and therapeutic work of nursing, and assigning bedside care to non-nursing staff. This grew out of 'total patient care' which involved nurses taking on additional clinical roles such as occupational therapy tasks, their work load increased accordingly. Nurses reported being concerned about qualitative differences in patient care that weren't being measured, as well as increased pressure and uncertainty due to extensive changes.

Current terminology for this practice model - 'Relationship-Based Care' - applies the original concepts of Primary Nursing to all functions and relationships within the hospital setting.

See also
 Florence Nightingale
 Advanced practice nurse
 Critical care nursing
 Team nursing

Further reading

Manthey, Marie; Ciske, K.; Robertson, P.; Harris, I. (1970). Primary nursing: A return to the concept of "my nurse" and "my patient". Nursing Forum 9 (1): 65–84. doi:10.1111/j.1744-6198.1970.tb00442.x.
Manthey, Marie; Marlene Kramer (1970). A dialogue on primary nursing. Nursing Forum 9 (4): 356–379. doi:10.1111/j.1744-6198.1970.tb01048.x.
Manthey, Marie (1973). Primary Care is Alive and Well in the Hospital. American Journal of Nursing 73 (1). January 1973.
Ciske, Karen L. Primary Nursing evaluation, AJN, American Journal of Nursing: August 1974 - Volume 74 - Issue 8 - p 1436-1438 
 Werner, J., Page, J. O., & Church, O. (1977). The Evanston story: primary nursing comes alive. Nursing Administration Quarterly, 28.
 Werner, J. (1979). Primary nursing. In Highlights of Chief, Nursing Service Workshop, Held Nov. 7-11, 1977 (p. 17). Veterans Administration.
Manthey, Marie (1980). "A Theoretical Framework for Primary Nursing". Journal of Nursing Administration (JONA) 10 (6): pp 11–15. June 1980.

 Wright, Stephen G. (1994) My Patient, My Nurse. London: Scutari Press. 

Manthey, Marie (2002). The Practice of Primary Nursing. Minneapolis, MN: Creative Health Care Management. p. 1. .
 Koloroutis, Mary, Jayne Felgen, Donna Wright, Colleen Person, Marie Manthey and Leah Kinnaird, Relationship-Based Care: A Model for Transforming Practice (2004) .
Koloroutis, Mary (2004). Relationship-Based Care: A Model for Transforming Practice. Minneapolis, MN: Creative Health Care Management. p. 165. .
 Koloroutis, Mary, Jayne Felgen, Colleen Person and Susan Wessel, Relationship-Based Care Field Guide (2007)
 Glembocki, Margaret J. and Joyce J. Fitzpatrick; Editors, Advancing Professional Nursing Practice: Relationship-Based Care and the ANA Standards (2013)
Wessel, S., & Manthey, M. (2015) Primary Nursing: Person-Centered Care Delivery System Design.  Minneapolis, MN: Creative Health Care Management.

 Koloroutis, Mary, RN and  David Abelson, MD, Advancing Relationship-Based Cultures (2017)

Notes

References

External links
 Nursing Practice in Primary Care and Patients’ Experience of Care 2018 Jan 22
John Nelson and Marie Manthey Explore the Model of Primary Nursing Youtube 5/21/21

Nursing